Fair debt collection broadly refers to regulation of the United States debt collection industry at both the federal and state level. At the Federal level, it is primarily governed by the Fair Debt Collection Practices Act (FDCPA). In addition, many U.S. states also have debt collection laws that regulate the credit and collection industry and give consumer debtors protection from abusive and deceptive practices.  Many state laws track the language of the FDCPA, so that they are sometimes referred to as mini-FDCPAs.

Laws regulating telemarketing and phone solicitation can also apply to debt collection practices, including the Federal Telephone Consumer Protection Act of 1991 (TCPA).

State regulation 
U.S. state laws on fair debt collection generally fall into two categories:  laws which require persons who are collecting debts from consumers to be licensed, registered or bonded in order to collect from consumers in their states, and laws that protect consumers from specific unfair practices by debt collectors, which may include collection agencies and sometimes original creditors.  Unlike the FDCPA, many state laws also apply to the debt collection activity of original creditors, thus providing greater protections to consumers than the Federal FDCPA. 

Although not all states have such laws, some states track violations of debt collection practices laws.  Some states bar debt collectors from engaging in collection activity against residents of the state unless the collection agency has complied with state licensing or bonding requirements, while others exempt out-of-state collectors from those requirements. Many state fair debt collection laws provide for a private right of action (consumers can sue the debt collector) by consumers against debt collectors that violate their provisions.

Examples of prohibitions of unfair practices by collectors include contacting employers after having been given notice not to do so, pretending to be a government agency, pretending to be an attorney or falsely threatening a debtor with a lawsuit.

Collection laws
The following states have their own debt collection laws, which can be found here:
Alabama: Ala. Code Sec. 40-12-80
Alaska: Alaska Stat. Sec. 08.24.041-08.24.380; Alaska Stat. Sec. 45.50.471.
Arizona: Ariz. Rev. Stat. Ann. sec. 32-1001 - 1057
Arkansas: Ark. Stat. Ann. Sec. 17-24-101 -404
California: Cal. Civ. Code Sec. 1788-1788.33, 1812.700 - .702
Colorado: Colo. Rev. Stat. Sec. 5-1-101 - 5-12-105; Sec. 12-04-101 -137
Connecticut: Conn. Gen Stat. Sec. 36a-645 - -647
Delaware: Del. Code Ann. tit. 30, Sec. 2301(a)(12)
Florida: Fla. Stat. Sec. 559.55-.785
Georgia: Ga. Code. Ann. Sec. 7-3-1 -29
Hawaii: Haw. Rev. Stat. Sec. 443B-1 -20; Sec. 480D-1 et seq.
Idaho: Idaho Code Sec. 26-222 -2251
Illinois: 225 Ill. Comp. Stat. 425/1 to /25
Indiana: Ind. Code Ann.Sec. 25-11-1-1 to -13; Sec. 24-4.55-107
Iowa: Iowa Code Ann. Sec. 537.7101 -.7103
Kansas: Kan. Stat. Ann. Sec. 16a-5-107
Kentucky: Ky. rev. Stat. ann. Sec. 24A-240 (re: CA in small claims ct)
Louisiana: La.rev.Stat. Sec. 9:3576.1 -3576.24; Sec. 9:3557-9:3562
Maine: Me.Rev.Stat.Amm. tit.32, Sec. 11001 - 11054; tit.9-A, Sec. 5-107, -116, -117, -201
Maryland: Md.Ann.Code. Bus. Reg. Sec. 7-101 -502
Massachusetts: Mass. Gen Laws Ann ch 93, Sec. 49
Michigan: Mich. Comp. Laws Sec. 339.901 -.920; 445.251 - 445.258,
Minnesota: Minn. Stat. Ann. Sec. 332.31 -.44
Mississippi: Miss. Code Sec. 97-9-1
Missouri: Mo. Rev. Stat. Chpt. 425
Nebraska: Neb. Rev. Stat. Ann. Sec. 45-601 -622
Nevada: Nev. Rev. Stat. Ann. Sec. 649.010 -.035
New Hampshire: N.H. Rev. Stat. Chapster. 358-C
New Jersey: N.J. Stat. Ann. Sec. 45:18 -6.1
New Mexico: N.M. Stat.Ann. Sec. 61-18A
New York: N.Y. Gen. Bus. Law Sec. 600-603,
North Carolina: N.C. Gen.Stat. Chapter 58, Article 70; N.C. Gen. Stat. Chapter 75, Article 2.
North Dakota: N.D. Cent. Code Sec. 13-05-01 -10
Ohio: Ohio Rev. Code Ann. Sec. 1319.12
Oklahoma: Okla. Stat. tit. 14A, Sec. 5-107
Oregon: Or. Rev. Stat. Sec. 646.639 -.656; Sec, 697.005 -.095
Pennsylvania: 18 Pa. Const. Stat. Ann. Sec. 7311; 73 Pa. Stat. Sec. 2270.1 -.6
Rhode Island: R.I. Gen. Laws Sec. 19-14.9 -14.14
South Carolina: S.C. Code Sec. 37-5-108
Tennessee: Tenn. Code. Ann. Sec. 62-20-101 -126
Texas: Tex. Fin. Code Sec. 392.001 -.404, 396.001 -.353
Utah: Utah Code Ann. Sec. 12-1-1 -10; Sec. 70C-7-104 -106
Vermont: Vt. Stat. Ann. tit 9, Sec. 2451a -2461
Virginia: Va. Code. 18.1-213
Washington: Wash. Rev. Code.Ann. Sec. 19.16.100 -.950
Washington, D.C.: D.C. Code Ann. Sec. 22-3401 -3403; Sec. 28-3814 -3816; Sec. 28-3901 -3909
West Virginia: W.Va. Code. Sec. 47-16-1 -5; Sec. 46A-2-122 -129a
Wisconsin: Wis. Stat. Ann. Sec. 218.04; Sec. 427.101 -.105
Wyoming: Wyo. Stat. Sec. 33-11-101 -116; Sec. 40-14-507

See also 
 Bank regulation in the United States

References

Bank regulation in the United States
Bankruptcy in the United States
Contract law
Debt collection
Statutory law